Gun cameras are cameras mounted on a gun, used to photograph or record from its perspective. They are typically used on the weapons of military aircraft and operate either when the gun is fired or at the operator's will. Gun cameras are used for training, analysis, or documentation purposes.

History 
The use of gun cameras first became common for gunnery training in the 1920s, though examples were used during World War I by the British Royal Flying Corps. A special version of the Lewis gun, the Hythe Mark III, was manufactured as a camera gun for the Royal Flying Corps, used by trainees in lieu of actual Lewis guns during mock combat exercises.

During World War II gun cameras were commonly used on operational aircraft to record kills of enemy aircraft. Many photographs and videos from gun cameras, such as those filmed by USAAF flying ace Lieutenant Colonel Jack T. Bradley, survive to this day and are often used as stock footage. In 2017, a Zeiss nose-mounted gun camera used by the Luftwaffe was posted for sale on eBay; one year later, a Japanese training gun camera, the Rokuoh-Sha Type 89, was also sold online.

Gun cameras technically still exist in modern fighter aircraft and attack helicopters, though they are typically no longer their own separate devices; rather, they are often built into targeting pods, and are able to record footage without the pilot or crew having to fire.

Applications 
Gun cameras are used by militaries, primarily air forces, for training, analysis, or documentation purposes.

The cameras are typically installed in the nose of the plane, on the nose-mounted gun (if one is there), or occasionally on the side or in a wing to provide a clearer view. According to USAF General Robin Olds, a triple ace of World War II, the Lockheed P-38 Lightning's gun camera was mounted directly below the aircraft's Hispano M2 20 mm autocannon, which shook the camera whenever they were fired, making the footage they filmed illegible. In 1944, when Olds was a USAAF fighter pilot, he did not report a battle with two Focke-Wulf Fw 190s, as his gun camera footage was too shaky to confirm the kills; however, a nearby fighter group that witnessed the dogfight confirmed the kills for him.

On older aircraft, tail gunner turrets, or trainer aircraft, gun cameras replace the gun itself, allowing for simulated gunnery practice without actually using a real gun or ammunition.

To track the weapon's fire, the guns the cameras are mounted to often use tracer ammunition; the images or footage produced by the camera also tend to have overlaid reticles.

Firearm camera 

Gun cameras on firearms are used in a manner similar to helmet cameras or body cameras. The cameras are mounted as underbarrel attachments and typically record when activated by the user, or automatically when removed from the weapon's holster.

Firearm cameras are typically used by law enforcement to provide clearer images than body cameras, which can be blocked by the arm or weapon while aiming. According to Viridian Weapon Technologies, a company that manufactures gun cameras, "more than 500 agencies across 47 states" were in the process of testing or adopting firearm cameras as of 2020. Though police said firearm cameras would allow for better police accountability, the American Civil Liberties Union questioned their effectiveness, stating that it would only record police brutality incidents where the officer drew their weapon, and that even in those incidents, the context leading up to the officer's weapon being drawn would not be captured.

Some gun cameras allow the user to see around corners, such as the camera installed in the CornerShot. In this case, they are more similar to holographic weapon sights or tactical fiberscopes than a traditional gun camera.

Gallery

See also 

 Robot II

References

External links

The Lt. Col. Jack Bradley Collection, no. 2 - Gun Camera Footage, from the Texas Archive of the Moving Image

Aerial cameras
Aircraft weapons
Firearm components
Weapon operation